The Freedom of the City of London started around 1237 as the status of a 'free man' or 'citizen', protected by the charter of the City of London and not under the jurisdiction of a feudal lord. In the Middle Ages, this developed into a freedom or right to trade, becoming closely linked to the medieval guilds, the livery companies. In 1835 eligibility for the freedom of the City was extended to anyone who lived in, worked in or had a strong connection to the City. The freedom that citizens enjoy has long associations with privileges in the governance of the City.

Whilst no longer carrying many substantive rights and largely existing as a tradition, the freedom is a pre-requisite for standing for election to the Common Council and Court of Aldermen of the City of London. The Lord Mayor of the City must first become an alderman, and hence must also be a freeman.

There are multiple routes to gaining the freedom of the City of London.

The original three routes to the freedom, via the livery companies, still exist. An individual can become a freeman of a livery company by servitude (apprenticeship), patrimony (either parent being a member of that livery company), or redemption (general admission, the criteria varying by livery company). Once a freeman of a livery company, an application can be made to the Chamberlain's Court for admission as a freeman of the City, which requires approval from Common Council. It is necessary to become a freeman of the City to advance to the livery company status of 'liveryman', or to hold an office in a livery company. Liverymen have electoral rights in the City of London in voting for certain offices.

It is also possible to become a freeman of the City by nomination by two common councillors, aldermen or liverymen.

Similarly, due to freedom being a pre-requisite for standing for elected office in the City, it is possible for a prospective candidate to obtain freedom by nomination by any two electors.

There is a long-standing tradition of the City admitting women to the freedom. Although they are now usually called freemen as well, historically the term was free sisters.

Freemen are admitted by the Clerk of the Chamberlain's Court during a ceremony at Guildhall.

Honorary Freedom 
Honorary Freedom of the City of London is a recognition of lifetime achievement or high international standing, and is much rarer than the broader freedom of the city.

The granting of the Honorary Freedom of the City of London (or Freedom Honoris Causa) is extremely rare and generally awarded today only to royalty, heads of state, or figures of genuine global standing. It is the greatest honour that is in the power of the City of London to bestow, and usually takes place in Guildhall in the presence of the Common Council and the lord mayor, sheriffs, and aldermen, along with invited guests.

For example, in 2013 after a gap of some eleven years, Archbishop Desmond Tutu received the Honorary Freedom of the City of London with the ceremony taking place at Mansion House. In 1996 Nelson Mandela, as President of South Africa, received the same honour. The presentation on such occasions is made by the Chamberlain of the City of London and is often followed by a banquet at Guildhall or Mansion House. Historically, the first personage to be so honoured was William Pitt the Elder in 1757. However, there are also records of the presentation of such in May 1698 to Philemon Philip Carter, son of Nathaniel Carter (goldsmiths) in the "Freedom of the City Admission Papers" 1681–1930. For many years it was the custom to present the Freedom in specially commissioned and unique gold or silver caskets, the design of which was inspired by the background and the achievements of the individual to which it was presented. More normal today would be to present the honour in the form of a scroll in an inscribed box.

List of Freemen 

The mixed list below contains just some of the names of people who have received the Freedom or Honorary Freedom over the years. Dates of awards are shown in brackets.

Royal Family members

Prime ministers of the United Kingdom

Victoria Cross and George Cross recipients
 William Reid
 Joshua Leakey (5 May 2016)

Foreign royalty
 Margrethe II of Denmark (2000)
 David Bagration of Mukhrani, Head of the Royal House of Georgia.
 Otto von Habsburg (11 July 2007)
 Michael I of Romania (2011)
 Kigeli V of Rwanda (28 June 2016)

Presidents of the United States of America

International leaders

Entrepreneurs and academics

Archbishops of Canterbury, York and London
 Randall, Lord Davidson of Lambeth (1928)
 Geoffrey Fisher (1952)
 Robert Runcie (2 January 1981)
 Rowan Williams

Religious leaders

Diplomats

Entertainment and the arts

Historically notable Britons

Other notable recipients
 Sir Thomas Phillips (voted 26 February 1840, admitted on 7 April 1840)
 Sir James Willcocks (11 July 1901). Freedom of the City of London with sword of honour.
 Frederick Cook (15 October 1909)
 Charles Lindbergh
 Roy Chadwick (1943)
 Frederick Penny, 1st Viscount Marchwood
 Frank Marshall, Baron Marshall of Leeds
 Bartholomew Broadbent (17 January 1985)
 Ari Norman (6 November 1992) for services to the British silver industry
 Ed Mirvish
 Brian Dear (3 October 2001) for charity work
 Massimo Ellul (26 September 2005)
 Peter Ackroyd (15 December 2006)
 Bob Winter (10 September 2007)
 Shaw Clifton (13 September 2007)
 Lasse Lehtinen (21 September 2007)
 Liam Hackett (15 September 2010)
 Robin Tilbrook (27 September 2011)
 David Wallin (approved 19 July 2012, admitted 1 March 2021)
 David Weir (3 December 2012)
 Alastair Cook
 Dwayne Fields (2013)
 Crista Cullen (23 August 2013)
 Rob Whiteman (1 May 2014), public servant and CEO of CIPFA
 Mark Carney (2014), former governor, Bank of Canada; former governor, Bank of England
 Chris Pavlou
 Nigel Cumberland (29 June 2016)
 Angelo Musa (19 April 2016)
 Tom Cox (April 2017)
 Joseph de Giorgio-Miller (July 2018)
 Kevin John Reid (24 May 2019)
 Adam Ockelford (2021)
 Tom Harwood (14 February 2022)
 Luis Felipe Tilleria (23 February 2022)

 Mark Noble (November 2022) life-long football player at West Ham United
 Harry Kane (January 2023) England Men's Football Captain

See also 
Burgess of Edinburgh
Bourgeois of Brussels
Bourgeois of Paris
Bourgeoisie of Geneva

References

Further reading
 London's Roll of Fame: Being Complimentary Notes and Addresses from the City of London, on Presentation of the Honorary Freedom of that City, and on Other Occasions, to Royal Personages, Statesmen... A.D. 1757-1884 etc. (The City of London Corporation, Cassell & Co., 1884). Benjamin Scott (ed.)
 London's Roll of Fame: Being Presentations of the Freedom of the City and Addresses of Welcome from the Corporation of London to Royal and other Distinguished Personages, A.D. 1885-1959. (The City of London Corporation, 1959).
 Valerie Hope, Clive Birch & Gilbert Torry, The Freedom: the Past and Present of the Livery, Guilds and City of London. (Barracuda Books, 1982).
 Caroline Arnold, Sheep over London Bridge: Freedom of the City of London. (Corporation of London Records Office, 1996). 
 Some Rules for the Conduct of Life, to which are added a few cautions: For the use of such Freemen of London as take Apprentices. (Chamberlain's Court, Guildhall, London).
 Addresses presented from the Court of Common Council to the King, on his Majesty's accession to the Throne, and on Various other Occasions, and his answers; Resolutions of the Court, Granting the Freedom of the City to several Noble Personages, with their answers; Instructions at different times to the Representatives of the City in Parliament; Petitions to Parliament for different purposes; Resolutions of the Court, on the Memorial of the Livery, to request the Lord Mayor to call a Common Hall; for returning thanks to Lord Chatham, and his answer; for erecting a Statue in Guildhall, to William Beckford, Esq; late Lord Mayor, agreed to between the 23rd October, 1760, and the 12th October 1770. (printed by Henry Fenwick, printer to the Honourable City of London).
 Addresses, Remonstrances, and Petitions; commencing the 24th of June, 1769, presented to the King and Parliament, from the Court of Common Council, and the Livery in Common Hall assembled, with his Majesty's answers; likewise the speech to the King, made by the late Mr. Alderman Beckford, when Lord Mayor of the City of London. (printed by Henry Fenwick, London).
 A Petition of the Freeholders of the County of Middlesex, presented to His Majesty, the 24th of May, 1769, by Mr. Serjeant Glynn, John Sawbridge, Esq; James Townsend, Esq; the Rev. Dr. Wilson, George Bellas, Esq; Francis Ayscough, Esq; and William Ellis, Esq. (printed by Henry Fenwick, London).

History of the City of London
People from the City of London
London
Honorary Freemen